Christine Sandra Abizaid (born 1979) is an American intelligence officer who is the director of the National Counterterrorism Center in the Biden administration.

Education 
Abizaid earned a Bachelor of Arts degree in psychology from the University of California, San Diego (UCSD) and a Master of Arts in international policy studies from Stanford University.

A soccer player from an early age, Abizaid played forward for the NCAA Division II UC San Diego Tritons women's soccer team. Her 36 career assists are the second most for the team all-time. During her time with the team, the Tritons were California Collegiate Athletic Association and NCAA champions, and in her senior year she was saluted as "best of the best" by the UCSD Guardian newspaper.

Career 
Abizaid has worked as a counterterrorism intelligence official in the Defense Intelligence Agency and on the United States National Security Council. During the Obama administration, she served as a senior policy advisor and assistant to the president for homeland security and counterterrorism. In 2014, she became the deputy assistant secretary of defense for Afghanistan, Pakistan, and Central Asia.

In 2016, Ash Carter put Abizaid in charge of the Defense Innovation Unit in Austin, Texas. Moving to the private sector, she joined Dell in 2017 as director for supply chain sustainability.

The 2019 Form 990 for the Middle East Policy Council lists Abizaid as a Director.  she remains listed as a Director on the organization's website.

In 2021, President Joe Biden nominated Abizaid to serve as the director of the National Counterterrorism Center. The United States Senate Select Committee on Intelligence held open hearings on the nomination on June 9, 2021. The full Senate confirmed her nomination by voice vote on June 24, 2021.

In 2022, Abizaid participated in a July 1, 2022 Situation Room meeting with President Biden to prepare for a drone strike targeting al-Qaeda leader Ayman al-Zawahiri. The approved operation took place July 31, 2022. President Biden made a public address confirming the operation had killed Zawahiri on August 1, 2022.

In subsequent testimony to Congress, Abizaid asserted that as a result of Zawahiri's death, the threat of al-Qaeda "is less acute than at any other time since 9/11," and "the most likely threat in the United States is from lone actors, whether inspired by violent extremist narratives, racially or ethnically motivated drivers to violence, or other politically motivated violence." Writers for Lawfare were led to state that following the operation, it was "difficult to believe that [al-Qaeda] can exert the same threat given its leadership depletion".

In 2023, delivering a lecture before the Washington Institute for Near East Policy, Abizaid noted that al-Qaeda has yet to publicly announce a successor following Zawahiri's death. Her comments briefly mentioned Saif al-Adel and Abd al-Rahman al-Maghribi as possible candidates.

Personal life 
Abizaid, a Lebanese American is the daughter of John Abizaid, a retired United States Army general who served as Commander of the U.S. Central Command during the Iraq and Afghanistan Wars, and diplomat, who served as U.S. Ambassador to Saudi Arabia under President Donald Trump.

Abizaid disclosed on her 2021 questionnaire to the United States Senate Select Committee on Intelligence that she is married to a woman. She was also accompanied to her Senate confirmation hearing by her wife, whom she acknowledged in her remarks. The New York Times noted that she was the first woman and first openly gay person to be confirmed as head of the Center.

In May 2022, Abizaid spoke with Michael Morell for the CBS News podcast Intelligence Matters, affirming her sexual orientation and that she recognizes "that it's important and it's important to be seen in the position that I'm in, that people will look at what I'm doing and will take a representation of that and latch on to it - good, bad or indifferent." The following month, she spoke to an audience at a Defense Intelligence Agency Pride Month event, speaking about having once been closeted at the agency. She commented that, "I could have been more brave and placed more trust in people," and that "frankly, it's just easier," being open.

External links 
 Biography at DNI.gov

Media Appearances 
 
 Interview: 
 Interview with 
 Roundtable discussion with Rep. Adam Smith, Sen. Dan Sullivan and former NATO Ambassador Douglas Lute: 
 In Conversation with Lt. General (ret.) Robert Noonan: 
 Keynote Speech at the 2022 Eradicate Hate Global Summit , 2022-09-21, retrieved 2022-12-07.
 Interview:

Nomination Materials from the Senate Select Committee on Intelligence 

 Opening Statement
 Response to Questionnaire for Completion by Presidential Nominees
 Response to Committee Additional Pre-Hearing Questions
 Response to Committee Questions for the Record

Congressional Testimony 

 Testimony before the Senate hearing, 
 Testimony before the House of Representatives hearing,

References 

Living people
UC San Diego Tritons women's soccer players
Stanford University alumni
Biden administration personnel
Obama administration personnel
American people of Lebanese descent
American LGBT military personnel
1979 births
American women's soccer players
Women's association football forwards